Nantucket Cottage Hospital is a not-for-profit regional medical center located in Nantucket, Massachusetts and is the only hospital on the island.  Founded in 1911 and conceived by the visions of Dr. John S. Grouard and Dr. Benjamin Sharp.  The original small Cottage Hospital on West Chester Street grew apace with the island community's needs. In 1957, the hospital opened new facilities at its current site, 57 Prospect Street. In the 1960s, when that building was deemed too small, a wing was added to accommodate the growing need for comprehensive medical care. In 2006, the hospital became an affiliate of Massachusetts General Hospital. An $89 million 106,000 square foot hospital building completely replaced the 1957 facility in 2019. The chairman of the Board of Trustees is Kevin Hickey, the hospital CEO is Gary A. Shaw, FACHE, and the president of the medical staff is Dr. Timothy Lepore.

References

External links

Hospital buildings completed in 1957
Buildings and structures in Nantucket, Massachusetts
Cottage hospitals
1911 establishments in Massachusetts
Hospitals in Massachusetts